54th Regiment of Foot was the designation of the 43rd (Monmouthshire) Regiment of Foot prior to 1751.

54th Regiment of Foot may also refer to:
43rd (Monmouthshire) Regiment of Foot, aka 54th Regiment of Foot, numbered as the 54th Foot in 1747 and renumbered as the 43rd in 1751
52nd (Oxfordshire) Regiment of Foot, aka 54th Regiment of Foot, raised in 1755 and renumbered as the 52nd in 1756

See also
 54th Infantry (disambiguation)